Nebel is a surname. Notable people with the surname include: 

 Berthold Nebel (1889–1964), sculptor
 Carl Nebel (1805–1855), lithographer of Mexico
 Carmen Nebel (born 1956), German television presenter
 Frederick Nebel (1903–1967), American pulp writer
 Jane Henson (born Jane Nebel; 1934–2013), American puppeteer 
 Long John Nebel (1911–1978), American talk radio personality
 Otto Nebel (1892–1973), German artist
 Paul Nebel (born 2002), German footballer
 Rudolf Nebel (1894–1978), German spaceflight advocate

Surnames from nicknames